Solidago pulchra,  the Carolina goldenrod, is a rare North American plant species in the family Asteraceae. It has been found only in the states of North Carolina and South Carolina in the southeastern United States.

Solidago pulchra  is a hairless perennial herb up to 80 cm (32 inches) tall, with a branched woody rootstock. One plant can produce as many as 50 flower in an elongated array. Ray flowers are yellow, 6-14 per head. Disc flowers number 12-30 per head. The species grows in moist, sandy depressions in pine woodlands.

References

pulchra
Plants described in 1933
Flora of the Southeastern United States
Flora without expected TNC conservation status